Jairo Rochez Crisanto (born 5 April 1991 in Roatan, Honduras) is a Honduran professional footballer who presently plays for Lobos UPNFM of the Liga Nacional de Fútbol Profesional de Honduras.

Early life

Born in Roatan, Rochez moved to the town of Plaplaya at the age of 5 with his family.

Career

Colombian trial

Trained with Colombian club Deportivo Pereira in 2014.

Belize

Joining Belmopan Bandits of the Belize Premier League in 2016, the Honduran striker participated in two training sessions with the squad before putting in what was seen as an exemplary performance on his debut by scoring a brace. That season, he ended up with the top scorer award, recording 14 goals in 10 outings.

References

External links 
 at Footballdatabase.eu
 at Soccerway

Association football forwards
Expatriate footballers in Colombia
1991 births
Living people
Honduran expatriate footballers
Lobos UPNFM players
Liga Nacional de Fútbol Profesional de Honduras players
Premier League of Belize players
People from Roatán
Expatriate footballers in Belize
Expatriate footballers in the Dominican Republic
Honduran expatriate sportspeople in Belize
Honduran expatriate sportspeople in the Dominican Republic
Honduran footballers
C.D. Victoria players
Belmopan Bandits players